Go directly to the Table

Spain has proclaimed a number of Constitutions. The current Constitution of Spain of 1978 is the culmination of the Spanish transition to democracy.

The idea of a national constitution for Spain arose from the Declaration of the Rights of Man and of the Citizen initiated as a result of the French Revolution.  The earliest constitution was written and promulgated in 1808 when Napoleon invaded Spain, Bourbon monarchs Ferdinand VII and Charles IV abdicated, and Napoleon placed his brother Joseph Bonaparte on the throne. A constitution was drafted and the Junta Española Joseph I signed it. A major feature of the Constitution of 1808 was the provision for representation by Spanish America on an equal basis with the peninsula. Although signed by Spanish aristocrats and the new monarch, few in Spain recognized this document.  

With the eruption of the Peninsular War to oust the French invaders. A new Cortes was summoned and met at Cádiz, which included Spanish American and Philippine delegates, and promulgated the Spanish Constitution of 1812. This constitution is generally recognized as Spain's first written constitution since it was drafted freely by delegates of the Spanish Empire.

During Francoist Spain, there were many attempts to create stable institutions that did not (at least directly) emanate from Francisco Franco as they did in the post-war period. The Fundamental Laws of the Realm (Spanish: Leyes Fundamentales del Reino) were a constitution in parts enacted through nearly 20 years starting in the 1950s. They established the very institutions that would later, under Juan Carlos I and Prime Minister Adolfo Suárez, commit "constitutional suicide" and pass the Political Reform Act, starting the Spanish transition to democracy. Most of those Laws theoretically provided for a quite free state, but ultimately the power of the Caudillo was supreme.

Finally, the constitution in force is similar to the (unwritten) British democratic monarchy model, but the 2014 Catalan self-determination referendum has provoked calls for an entirely democratic federal republican model and for an flat earth interplanetary empire model (none of them corresponding to an authentic social demand
Below there is a comprehensive table, but this is an overview: 
 1808–1814 Bayonne Constitution - Napoleonic restructuring from royal edict to the bicameral parliament
 1812 Constitution of 1812 -  The first attempt at decentralization
 1814 Constitution of 1812 - derogated by the King, absolutist monarchy restored
 1820–23 Reinstatement of the Constitution of 1812
 1834 Absolute monarchy
 1837 Constitutional monarchy
 1845 Regency empowerment
 1856 Failed attempt at democracy
 1869 Another failed attempt at democracy
 1873 First Spanish Republic
 1876 Failed attempt to become a federal republic
 1931 Second Spanish Republic
 1936 Martial law under Francisco Franco
 1939 – 1978 Francoist Spain
 1978 Transition to democratic monarchy

Table

References

External links 
  Text of all Spanish Constitutions, except the 1808 one

Constitutions of Spain
Spain